Parikh's theorem in theoretical computer science says that if one looks only at the number of occurrences of each terminal symbol in a context-free language, without regard to their order, then the language is indistinguishable from a regular language. It is useful for deciding that strings with a given number of terminals are not accepted by a context-free grammar. It was first proved by Rohit Parikh in 1961 and republished in 1966.

Definitions and formal statement
Let  be an alphabet. The Parikh vector of a word is defined as the function , given by 

where  denotes the number of occurrences of the letter  in the word .

for some vectors .

In short, the image under  of context-free languages and of regular languages is the same, and it is equal to the set of semilinear sets.

Two languages are said to be commutatively equivalent if they have the same set of Parikh vectors. Thus, every context-free language is commutatively equivalent to some regular language.

Proof 

The second part is easy to prove.

The first part is less easy. The following proof is credited to. 

First we need a small strengthening of the pumping lemma for context-free languages:

The proof is essentially the same as the standard pumping lemma: use the pigeonhole principle to find  copies of some nonterminal symbol  in the longest path in the shortest derivation tree.

Strengthening for bounded languages
A language  is bounded if  for some fixed words .
Ginsburg and Spanier 
gave a necessary and sufficient condition, similar to Parikh's theorem, for bounded languages.

A semi-linear set is stratified if it is a union of finitely many stratified linear subsets.

Significance
The theorem has multiple interpretations. It shows that a context-free language over a singleton alphabet must be a regular language and that some context-free languages can only have ambiguous grammars. Such languages are called inherently ambiguous languages. From a formal grammar perspective, this means that some ambiguous context-free grammars cannot be converted to equivalent unambiguous context-free grammars.

References

Formal languages